The Great Sierra Wagon Road was a route through the Sierra Nevada in California, built to bring supplies to the Great Sierra Mine on Tioga Hill in the high country of what was to become Yosemite National Park. The mine promptly shut down, leaving the road without a purpose. In 1915 the road was purchased by Stephen T. Mather, the independently wealthy first director of the National Park Service, who donated it to the Park Service. The Park Service opened the road to the public, calling it the Tioga Road. Designated California State Route 120, the road traverses the park from its west to east entrances.

The portion of the road that was listed on the National Register of Historic Places on August 25, 1978, is now known as the Old Tioga Road, left behind when the Tioga Road was realigned to avoid Aspen Valley in the western part of the park. The Old Tioga Road is a park service road, not open to the public apart from a short section that provides access to private inholdings. The road preserves stone retaining walls, known as "Chinese Walls" after the Chinese laborers who built them. The service road section remains largely unchanged from its original construction.

References

External links

Historic trails and roads in California
History of Tuolumne County, California
Roads in Tuolumne County, California
Roads on the National Register of Historic Places in California
National Register of Historic Places in Tuolumne County, California
National Register of Historic Places in Yosemite National Park
1882 establishments in California